"Join Together" is a song by British rock band the Who, first released as a non-album single in June 1972. The song has since been performed live multiple times and has appeared on numerous compilation albums.

"Join Together" is also notable for its roots in The Who's abandoned Lifehouse album, a quality shared by The Who's other 1972 single "Relay".

Background
"Join Together", under the working title of "Join Together With the Band", was originally intended to be released as part of the Lifehouse album, but upon the album's shelving, the song was temporarily abandoned. Following the abandoning of Lifehouse, "Join Together", as well as other songs initially intended to appear on the album, was used in the working track list of another canceled Who album, Rock Is Dead—Long Live Rock!.

The song was recorded on the same day as "Relay" (its follow-up single) and a demo of "Long Live Rock" in May 1972. The band's lead singer, Roger Daltrey, remembers the song positively, but claims that he was initially skeptical about using synthesizer.

With the definitive title of "Join Together", the song was released as a non-album single in 1972, backed with a live and unedited version of Marvin Gaye's "Baby Don't You Do It", recorded at San Francisco's Civic Auditorium on 13 December 1971. The single was successful, reaching number 9 on the British singles chart and number 17 on the US Billboard Hot 100. The single was the second of three non-album singles relating to the aborted Lifehouse project, the others being "Let's See Action" and "Relay".

It has been included on several compilations, including Hooligans, The Singles, The Who: The Ultimate Collection, 20th Century Masters: The Millennium Collection: The Best of The Who and The Who Hits 50!.

Promotion
A video shot in June 1972 shortly after completing the song featured The Who miming to playback in front of an excited audience. Roger Daltrey and Keith Moon play Jew's harps and Pete Townshend and John Entwistle play chord and bass harmonicas respectively to mime to all those instruments played by Townshend. Also during the video, Townshend and Daltrey's hands are bandaged.

The promotional film premiered in the U.S. on American Bandstand on 9 December 1972.

Live performances
The song was first performed live in their 1975 tour and 1976 tour, albeit more bluesy and abbreviated while attached to "My Generation"; it was played in this same arrangement early in the 1979 tour. It was performed once on the 1982 tour as well, tagged on to the end of "Magic Bus". For the 1989 tour, it was brought back, this time in the same arrangement as the studio version. On 13 January 2011, the band played this song with guests Debbie Harry, Jeff Beck and Bryan Adams as the show-closer for The Concert for Killing Cancer benefit show. It has also been played at almost every show of their The Who Hits 50! world tour. The band have also played the song in 2019.

Personnel
Roger Daltrey – lead vocals, harmonica 
Pete Townshend – guitar, synthesizer, jew's harp, backing vocals
John Entwistle – bass, backing vocals
Keith Moon – drums

UK/US 7" single track listing
Side A: "Join Together" (4:22)
Side B: "Baby Don't You Do It" (Live) (6:09)

References

External links
 

The Who songs
1972 singles
Track Records singles
Songs written by Pete Townshend
Song recordings produced by Glyn Johns
MCA Records singles
1972 songs
Songs about music